Donald Lawson Bates (10 May 1933 – 29 May 2005) was an English cricketer active from 1950 to 1971 who played for Sussex. He was born in Hove and died in Brighton. He appeared in 315 first-class matches as a right-handed batsman who bowled right-arm fast-medium. He scored 1,525 runs with a highest score of 37 not out and took 880 wickets with a best performance of eight for 51. He was awarded his county cap in 1957 and had a benefit in 1968 which raised £8,000.

References

External links
 Don Bates at Cricinfo

1933 births
2005 deaths
English cricketers
Sussex cricketers